Potten End is a village in west Hertfordshire, England. Nearby villages include Nettleden, Great Gaddesden and the hamlet of Frithsden. The village is part of the parish of Nettleden with Potten End within the borough of Dacorum.

History
The ecclesiastical parish of Potten End was formed in 1894, but the village of Potten End straddled the civil parishes of Great Berkhampstead Rural and Northchurch until the parish of Nettleden with Potten End was created in 1937.

The village name derives from the earlier form "Pottern" which refers to a place where pots and pottery were made. "End" is an old term common in Hertfordshire defining any outlying settlement in a far corner of a parish or manor.

Geography 
The geography of Potten End is such that most of the village is situated on a plateau of land extending from Ashridge to the north and rising from the valleys of the River Gade to the east and from the River Bulbourne to the west. The green lies at a height of approximately 165.5 m (543 ft) above mean sea level. Consequently, all roads from Potten End lead downhill.

Amenities

At the centre of the village there is a green and pond. The village largely comprises residential properties, together with Holy Trinity Church; a primary/junior school Potten End First School; a village shop; and two public houses, Martins' Pond ; and The Plough.  A number of small businesses are also based in the village. Recreational facilities include cricket and football fields, bowls club and a children's grassed play area. A Village Hall provides community use for a wide variety of regular and special events.

There has been only minimal building development in the village in recent years and no immediate prospect of the surrounding farming land being given over to residential expansion. The Parish Council are keen to retain this status quo but are concerned that eventually the green belt will be lost by the growth of Hemel Hempstead where the gap is now down to little more than a mile from the boundary at Hempstead Lane.

Live Potten End weather information is available on the Potten End weather web site.

The long distance county footpath the Hertfordshire Way  passes on the west side of the village.

Public transport to/from the village comprises an infrequent bus service (to Hemel Hempstead & to Berkhamsted) of five return trips a day. The nearest rail link is at Berkhamsted station, 2 miles distant.

Following his retirement from professional cricket Fred Titmus and his wife Stephanie ran the post office and newsagent's shop in the village for 20 years. Subsequently, this facility transferred to the village shop but following a review by the post office, the sub post office counter was removed in 2008 despite a campaign to save it by the village and local MP.

Open Day
Every two years on the last Sunday in June, the village hosts an Open Day, with special outdoor events and a number of private gardens open to the public. The last such event was held on 26 June 2011.

Places of worship

The Anglican church of Holy Trinity was designed in an Italian Romanesque style by the architect Francis Penrose and consecrated in 1868.  For its first thirty years operated as a Chapel of Ease to Berkhamsted St. Peter, before becoming the church of the newly created ecclesiastical parish of Potten End. In recent years the church has reformed links with St. Peter as part of the Berkhamsted Team Ministry. The parish lies within the Church of England Diocese of St. Albans. 

The church has a graveyard within its boundaries and in 2006 an additional Parish Burial Ground was consecrated on an area of land down Hempstead Lane. The monthly church newsletter is delivered to every household in the village and includes local news and articles, council reports and historical items from the 'Potten End Archivist'.

A small baptist chapel (with small graveyard) also existed. This was on a site set back from the general frontage of properties on The Front. The chapel was closed and the building sold in 1997 and is now a private residence.

References

Villages in Hertfordshire
Dacorum